Beijing Baic Motor women's volleyball team is a professional women's volleyball club based in Beijing, and play in the Chinese Women's Volleyball League. Their sponsor is Beijing Automobile Works.

They won the Chinese Women's Volleyball League group B in 2010–2011 season. In 2011–2012 season they play in the Chinese Women's Volleyball League group A.

The team won their first Chinese champion title in Season 2018/19.

CVL results

Team roster 2015-2016

Team roster 2018-2019

Former players
  Feng Kun (1995-2006)
  Xue Ming (2005-2013)
  Han Xu (2005-2014)
  Seda Tokatlıoğlu (2014-2015)
  Kelsey Robinson (2014-2015, 2016-2017)
  Jana Matiasovska-Aghayeva (2015-2016)
  Natasa Krsmanovic (2015-2016)
  Suzana Cebic (2015-2016)
  Karsta Lowe (2016-2017)

See also
Beijing BAIC Motor Men's Volleyball Team

External links
 

Chinese volleyball clubs
Sport in Beijing
BAIC Group
Women's volleyball teams
Women in Beijing